Municipal Corporations of Uttarakhand are the local governing bodies of the cities in Uttarakhand. There are 8 such Municipal corporations in this Indian state.

Municipal Corporations

List of Current Municipal Corporations

Municipal Corporation Headquarters on map

See also
 Municipal Corporation
 Mayor
 Municipal Commissioner
 Local government in India
 Municipal governance in India
 Municipal elections in India
 List of municipal corporations in India
 List of metropolitan areas in India
 List of urban local bodies in Uttarakhand
 List of cities in India by population
 List of cities in Uttarakhand by population

References

 
Uttarakhand-related lists
Municipal corporation